COIN (short for COunterINsurgency) is a series of multiplayer asymmetric strategy board wargames simulating historic insurgency and counter-insurgency conflicts and irregular warfares throughout the world. It is published by GMT Games.

An example of COIN games is Cuba Libre, which is set in the Cuban Revolution during 1957-1958 and has the players take the role of factions struggling for control of Cuba. Another example is Pendragon: The Fall of Roman Britain, which simulates the decline of the Roman Britain in the 5th century through the power struggle between the post-Roman army, Briton lords, and invading barbarians.

The series has been noted for its innovative and dynamic gameplay, compared to more traditional hex-and-counter two-player wargames. GMT Games publishes the games and releases new titles through its P500 system, and maintains several new COIN games in development pipeline at a given time.

Most of the published titles are available for playing through Vassal Engine modules.

Game 
COIN games simulate past and ongoing historical insurgencies and counter-insurgencies by pitting up to four players against each other. Every players plays different factions with unique powers, resources, and play styles while striving to achieve different winning conditions. All games in the COIN series share the same underlying system designed by game designer Volko Ruhnke, first found in Andean Abyss, the original game of the series.

All of the games are playable solo. Non-player rules are included for players who wish to play by themselves, or for playing the game with less than the maximum amount of players. The non-player rules enables a non-player-controlled faction to participate in the game based on a predetermined set of actions.

Components 
Components of a COIN game include a board depicting the map of the region relevant to the theme of each game which serves as the main play area. The board contains divisions of the regions and specific localities such as cities, settlements, economic centers, and spaces for building fortifications. Some also features roads or lines of communications (roads, highways, oil pipelines, etc.) which players may interact with. Bordering foreign regions are also included where relevant to the gameplay, such as for the purpose of foreign aids, overseas raiding, and more.

Other components are wooden colored player pieces, a deck of Event cards, player aids, cardboard chits or tokens, a rulebook, and a playbook. The rulebook explains the rules of play in detail, while the playbook provides example plays with turn-by-turn explanation and analysis, historical contexts, game variants in form of scenarios, and notes from the designers.

Gameplay 
COIN games offers several unique playable factions. Often, each has different objectives, pieces, resources, available actions, and/or starting positions. They represent their forces and holdings by placing and removing their pieces on the board, while adjusting states such as support/opposition level, victory condition progress, and amount of resources left.

All games in the series are notable for not using a hand of cards, unlike many card-driven wargames. Instead, Event cards are revealed from the deck as the game progresses, which gives bonuses or detrimental effects to players and/or break the normal rules. They also dictate the turn order of players. Some Event cards benefit or damage a specific faction, or grants effects which may become an advantage or disadvantage depending on the game state.

Players conduct their actions to further their agendas and achieve their objectives, such as having control in several regions or collecting a set amount of resources. The action selection system limits the actions a player may take depending on what the previous players did. Players may choose to execute their full actions at the risk of the next player getting the advantage of the current Event card, or vice versa. The available actions (termed in-game as Operations/Commands and Special Activities) range from marching units to a different region, terrorizing a local city, training new soldiers, attacking enemy units, and many more.

Several special cards shuffled in a prescribed way into the deck of Event cards determines the game flow while causing unpredictability. The appearance of the special cards mandates a special round (called Propaganda rounds, Coup rounds, Epoch rounds, etc. depending on the game) where victory conditions are checked and some states are changed or reverted.

Different game scenarios modifies the length of the game, starting conditions, victory conditions, and many more.

List of COIN games 
This list describes all COIN games that have been published by GMT Games, and does not include both new games in development or fan-made ones.
 Andean Abyss
 The first game of the series, designed by Volko Ruhnke and published in 2012. Andean Abyss is set in the 1990s Colombian conflict, and players can choose to play as the Colombian government, the insurgent FARC, the paramilitary AUC, or the drug-trafficking Cartels.
 Cuba Libre
 Designed by Jeff Grossman and Volko Ruhnke and published in 2013. The game is set in the Cuban Revolution. Players pick a side from a selection of the incumbent Batista government, the 26th of July Movement, the students-led Directorio activists group, or the Mafia-run Syndicate. Cuba Libre is one of the lightest game of the COIN series in term of rule complexity, and is often promoted as the "gateway game" for newcomers to the genre.
 A Distant Plain
 Designed by Brian Train and Volko Ruhnke and published in 2013. The game is set against the background of the modern modern Afghanistan conflict. The available factions include the Coalition forces, the pre-2021 Afghanistan government, the Islamist Taliban, and the narco-trafficking local Afghan warlords.
 Fire in the Lake
 Designed by Mark Herman and Volko Ruhnke and published in 2014. The game is set in the Vietnam War. The available factions include the United States, the North Vietnamese Army, the ARVN, and the Viet Cong.
 Liberty or Death: The American Insurrection
 Designed by Harold Buchanan and published in 2016. the game is set in the American war for independence. Players choose between the factions of the British Empire, the Patriots, the Indians, and the French.
 Falling Sky: The Gallic Revolt Against Caesar
 Designed by Volko and Andrew Ruhnke and published in 2016. The game is set in the Roman conquest of Gaul. The game pits the Roman Republic led by Julius Caesar against the rivaling Gallic tribes of Arverni, Aedui, and the Belgae confederation of tribes. Falling Sky also includes the occasional player-controlled Germanic tribes fifth faction.
 Colonial Twilight: The French-Algerian War, 1954–62
 Notably the only game in the series designed for 1–2 players. Designed by Brian Train and published in 2017. Taking a setting in the Algerian war for independence, players choose between the French colonial government and the Algerian FLN.
 Pendragon: The Fall of Roman Britain
 Designed by Morgane Gouyon-Rety and Volko Ruhnke and published in 2017. Pendragon is set in the period of Roman Britain decline in the 5th century. The game simulates the power struggle between the post-Roman army (the Dux), Briton lords, and Gaelic and Germanic barbarians (represented as the Scotti and Saxons, respectively).
 Gandhi: The Decolonization of British India, 1917–1947
 Designed by Bruce Mansfield and published in 2018. The game is set, as the title suggests, in the Indian independence movement portion led by Mahatma Gandhi. The game simulates four factions seeking to determine the fate of India: the British Raj, the Indian National Congress, the Muslim League, and Revolutionaries.
 All Bridges Burning: Red Revolt and White Guard in Finland, 1917–1918
 Designed by VPJ Arponen and published in 2020. The game is set in the Finnish Civil War. The first COIN game designed for 1–3 players, it features the Whites, the Reds, and the Moderates. Two external forces are also represented: the German Empire and the Soviet Russia.

References

External links
 GMT Games - COIN Series page

Board games